In special functions, a topic in mathematics, spin-weighted spherical harmonics are generalizations of the standard spherical harmonics and—like the usual spherical harmonics—are functions on the sphere. Unlike ordinary spherical harmonics, the spin-weighted harmonics are  gauge fields rather than scalar fields: mathematically, they take values in a complex line bundle. The spin-weighted harmonics are organized by degree , just like ordinary spherical harmonics, but have an additional spin weight  that reflects the additional  symmetry. In this special basis, the spin-weighted spherical harmonics appear as actual functions, because the choice of a polar axis fixes the  gauge ambiguity. The spin-weighted spherical harmonics can be obtained from the standard spherical harmonics by application of spin raising and lowering operators. In particular, the spin-weighted spherical harmonics of spin weight  are simply the standard spherical harmonics:

Spaces of spin-weighted spherical harmonics were first identified in connection with the representation theory of the Lorentz group .

Spin-weighted functions
Regard the sphere  as embedded into the three-dimensional Euclidean space .

for every rotation angle .

Concretely, these are understood as functions  on } satisfying the following homogeneity law under complex scaling

This makes sense provided  is a half-integer.

Abstractly,  is isomorphic to the smooth vector bundle underlying the antiholomorphic vector bundle  of the Serre twist on the complex projective line .  A section of the latter bundle is a function  on } satisfying

Specifically,  is a spin-weight  function.  The association of a spin-weighted function to an ordinary homogeneous function is an isomorphism.

The operator 
The spin weight bundles  are equipped with a differential operator  (eth).  This operator is essentially the Dolbeault operator, after suitable identifications have been made,

defines a function of spin-weight .

Spin-weighted harmonics
Just as conventional spherical harmonics are the eigenfunctions of the Laplace-Beltrami operator on the sphere, the spin-weight  harmonics are the eigensections for the Laplace-Beltrami operator acting on the bundles  of spin-weight  functions.

Representation as functions
The spin-weighted harmonics can be represented as functions on a sphere once a point on the sphere has been selected to serve as the North pole.  By definition, a function  with spin weight  transforms under rotation about the pole via

Working in standard spherical coordinates, we can define a particular operator  acting on a function  as:

(The operator  is effectively a covariant derivative operator in the sphere.)

An important property of the new function  is that if  had spin weight ,  has spin weight .  Thus, the operator raises the spin weight of a function by 1.  Similarly, we can define an operator  which will lower the spin weight of a function by 1:

The spin-weighted spherical harmonics are then defined in terms of the usual spherical harmonics as:

The functions  then have the property of transforming with spin weight .

Other important properties include the following:

Orthogonality and completeness 
The harmonics are orthogonal over the entire sphere:

and satisfy the completeness relation

Calculating
These harmonics can be explicitly calculated by several methods. The obvious recursion relation results from repeatedly applying the raising or lowering operators. Note that their formulae use an old choice for the Condon–Shortley phase. The convention chosen below is in agreement with Mathematica, for instance.

The more useful of the Goldberg, et al., formulae is the following:

A Mathematica notebook using this formula to calculate arbitrary spin-weighted spherical harmonics can be found here.

With the phase convention here:

First few spin-weighted spherical harmonics 

Analytic expressions for the first few orthonormalized spin-weighted spherical harmonics:

Spin-weight , degree

Relation to Wigner rotation matrices 

This relation allows the spin harmonics to be calculated using recursion relations for the -matrices.

Triple integral 

The triple integral in the case that  is given in terms of the 3- symbol:

See also
 Spherical basis

References

.
.
; (1963) Representations of the rotation and Lorentz groups and their applications (translation).  Macmillan Publishers.
 (Note: As mentioned above, this paper uses a choice for the Condon-Shortley phase that is no longer standard.)
.
 .

Fourier analysis
Rotational symmetry
Special functions